Shoccoe is an unincorporated community in Madison County, in the U.S. state of Mississippi.

History
A post office called Shoccoe was established in 1886, and remained in operation until 1909. A variant spelling is "Shocco". The name "Shoccoe" most likely is a transfer from a place in North Carolina.

Shoccoe had a population of 25 in 1900.

References

Unincorporated communities in Mississippi
Unincorporated communities in Madison County, Mississippi